is a Japanese track and field athlete who competes in the 200 metres, the 400 metres and the 400 m hurdles.

Her personal bests are 24.32 in the 200 m achieved at Kobe on April 27, 2008; 38.12 in the 300 metres at Izumo on April 22, 2007; 53.08 in the 400 metres in Osaka on June 30, 2007; and 55.34 in the 400 m hurdles at Osaka on June 26, 2011.

She competed in the 400 metres hurdles at the 2008 Beijing Olympics where she qualified for the second round with the twelfth fastest overall time of 55.82 seconds.

At the 2012 Summer Olympics, she reached the semi-finals of 400 metre hurdles.

Competition record

References

External links
 IAAF profile
 Profile at Nikkan Sports 

1982 births
Living people
People from Asahikawa
Sportspeople from Hokkaido
Japanese female hurdlers
Japanese female sprinters
Olympic female sprinters
Olympic athletes of Japan
Athletes (track and field) at the 2008 Summer Olympics
Athletes (track and field) at the 2012 Summer Olympics
Athletes (track and field) at the 2016 Summer Olympics
Asian Games silver medalists for Japan
Asian Games bronze medalists for Japan
Asian Games medalists in athletics (track and field)
Athletes (track and field) at the 2006 Asian Games
Athletes (track and field) at the 2010 Asian Games
Athletes (track and field) at the 2014 Asian Games
Medalists at the 2006 Asian Games
Medalists at the 2010 Asian Games
Medalists at the 2014 Asian Games
Japan Championships in Athletics winners
21st-century Japanese women